Murder in Wisconsin constitutes the intentional killing, under circumstances defined by law, of people within or under the jurisdiction of the U.S. state of Wisconsin.

The United States Centers for Disease Control and Prevention reported that in the year 2020, the state had a murder rate slightly below the median for the entire country.

In 2003, the Wisconsin Supreme Court upheld the year and a day rule in the case before it, but simultaneously abolished the rule for any later cases, noting the modern circumstances of homicide cases, in which there is "the specter of a family's being forced to choose between terminating the use of a life-support system and allowing an accused to escape a murder charge" and the court's finding that it is "unjust to permit an assailant to escape punishment because of a convergence of modern medical advances and an archaic rule from the thirteenth century".

Felony murder rule
In Wisconsin, the felony murder rule is found in Wis. Stat. Sec. 940.03 and was last revised in 2005.  Generally, the statute applies to dangerous felonies, felonies that have a propensity to cause great bodily harm, or those that involve a dangerous weapon or even a facade of a weapon.  Sentences adding felony murder are enhanced by a maximum of 15 years, plus whatever the maximum of the underlying felony awards.

Crimes in the felony murder statute in Wisconsin are:

 battery, including that to an unborn child
 Sexual assault of the first degree, or second degree if it is by use or threat of force or violence
 False imprisonment
 Kidnapping
 Arson of buildings or damage of property by explosives
 Burglary with a dangerous weapon, explosives, or burglary of any inhabited dwelling
 Carjacking
 Robbery with a dangerous weapon, or even with an object that leads someone to believe there is a dangerous weapon

Penalties

References

External links
Wisconsin Legislative Bureau, Statutes & Annotations
Wisconsin Legislative Documents

Murder in Wisconsin
U.S. state criminal law
Wisconsin law